Porreca is a surname. Notable people with the surname include:

Giorgio Porreca (1927–1988), Italian chess player
Marilyn Porreca (1932–2008), American politician
Cameron Porreca ,
American Businessman

Surnames of Italian origin